Andrew Ogletree (born July 28, 1998) is an American football tight end for the Indianapolis Colts of the National Football League (NFL). He played college football at Findlay and Youngstown State.

Early life and high school
Ogletree grew up in Dayton, Ohio and attended Northridge High School, where he played football and basketball.

College career
Ogletree began his college career at Findlay. Over the course of three seasons, he caught 54 passes for 785 yards and 10 touchdowns. He transferred to Youngstown State after his junior year. Ogletree caught 28 passes for 282 yards as a senior.

Professional career

Ogletree was selected by the Indianapolis Colts in the sixth round, 192nd overall, of the 2022 NFL Draft. On August 18, 2022, Ogletree was placed on injured reserve after suffering a torn ACL in training camp.

References

External links
 Indianapolis Colts bio
Findlay Oilers bio
Youngstown State Penguins bio

1998 births
Living people
Players of American football from Dayton, Ohio
American football tight ends
Findlay Oilers football players
Youngstown State Penguins football players
Indianapolis Colts players